Trevor Benson (1710–1782) was an Anglican priest in Ireland.

Benson was born in County Down and educated at Trinity College, Dublin. He was Prebendary of Kilroot in Lisburn Cathedral from 1763 to 1768; and Archdeacon of Down from 1768 until his death.

Notes

Alumni of Trinity College Dublin
Archdeacons of Down
18th-century Irish Anglican priests
1782 deaths
1710 births
People from Downpatrick